Eric Bell (born 1947) is an Irish musician; lead guitarist for Thin Lizzy.

Eric Bell may also refer to:

 Eric Temple Bell (1883–1960), Scottish author and mathematician
 Eric Norman Frankland Bell (1895–1916), Irish recipient of the Victoria Cross
 Eric Bell (baseball) (born 1963), American baseball player
 Eric Bell (footballer, born 1929) (1929–2012), English football player
 Eric Bell (footballer, born 1922) (1922–2004), English footballer
 Eric Allen Bell (born 1973), American documentary film writer and director
 Rico Bell (a.k.a. Eric Bellis), English artist and musician